The discography of Lil Yachty, an American rapper and singer, consists of five studio albums, three mixtapes, one collaborative mixtape, ten extended plays, ten music videos, thirteen guest appearances and thirty-one singles (including eighteen singles as a featured artist).

Albums

Studio albums

Deluxe albums

Mixtapes

EPs

Singles

As lead artist

As featured artist

Promotional singles

Other charted songs

Guest appearances

Music videos

Notes

References 

Discographies of American artists
Hip hop discographies